The Autumn of the Middle Ages, The Waning of the Middle Ages, or Autumntide of the Middle Ages (published in 1919 as Herfsttij der Middeleeuwen and translated into English in 1924, German in 1924, and French in 1932), is the best-known work by the Dutch historian Johan Huizinga.

In the book, Huizinga presents the idea that the exaggerated formality and romanticism of late medieval court society was a defense mechanism against the constantly increasing violence and brutality of general society. He saw the period as one of pessimism, cultural exhaustion, and nostalgia, rather than of rebirth and optimism.

His main conclusion is that the combination of required modernization of statehood governance, stuck in traditionalism, in combination with the exhausting inclusion of an ever-growing corpus of catholic rites and popular beliefs in daily life, led to the implosion of late medieval society. This provided light to the rise of (religious) individualism, humanism and scientific progress: the renaissance.

The book is written in well-chosen prose, that helped Huizinga's nomination for the 1939 Nobel Prize for Literature, won by Hermann Hesse that year. Huizinga ended in the third spot.

Huizinga's work later came under some criticism, especially for relying too heavily on evidence from the rather exceptional case of the Burgundian court. Other criticisms include the writing of the book being “old-fashioned” and “too literary”.

A new English translation of the book was published in 1996 because of perceived deficiencies in the original translation. The new translation, by Rodney Payton and Ulrich Mammitzsch, was based on the second edition of the Dutch publication in 1921 and compared with the German translation published in 1924.

To mark the centenary of Herfsttij a new translation by Diane Webb appeared in 2020, published by Leiden University Press: Autumntide of the Middle Ages. According to Benjamin Kaplan this translation “captures Huizinga’s original voice better than either of the two previous English editions.” This new English edition also includes for the first time 300 full-colour illustrations of all the works of art Huizinga mentions in his text.

In the 1970s, Radio Netherlands produced an audio series about the book, entitled "Autumn of the Middle Ages: A Six-part History in Words and Music from the Low Countries".

See also 
 The Civilization of the Renaissance in Italy

References

Sources 

 
 
 
  Translated by Diane Webb. Edited by Graeme Small & Anton van der Lem. The translation is based on the Dutch edition of 1941 – the last edition Huizinga worked on. It features English renderings of the Middle French poems and other contemporary sources, and its colour illustrations include over three hundred paintings and prints, illuminated manuscripts, and miniatures pertinent to Huizinga’s discourse. Also includes a complete bibliography of Huizinga’s sources and an epilogue that addresses the meaning and enduring importance of this classic work.

External links 
 .
 .
  (In original Dutch).


History books about the Middle Ages
Autumn of the Middle Ages, The
Autumn of the Middle Ages, The
Books by Johan Huizinga